Xerocrassa cobosi is a species of air-breathing land snail, a pulmonate gastropod mollusk in the family Geomitridae.

Distribution

This species is endemic to the Sierra de Gádor mountains in the province of Almería, Spain.

References

 Ortiz de Zárate López, A. (1962). Una especie nueva de Helicella (Helicella (Xeroplexa) cobosi). Archivos del Instituto de Aclimatación de Almería. 11: 41-43.
 Bank, R. A.; Neubert, E. (2017). Checklist of the land and freshwater Gastropoda of Europe. Last update: July 16th, 2017

cobosi
Molluscs of Europe
Endemic fauna of Spain
Gastropods described in 1962